The Illinois Republican Party is the affiliate of the Republican Party in the U.S. state of Illinois founded in May 29, 1856. It is run by the Illinois Republican State Central Committee, which consists of 18 members, one representing each of the state's congressional districts. Once the dominant party in Illinois, the state GOP has become a minority party within the last few decades, holding little power in the state. The current chairman is Don Tracy, who has served since 2021.

History

Before the 1990s
The Illinois Republican Party was organized at the Bloomington Convention in Major's Hall in Bloomington on May 29, 1856. Its founding members came from the former Whig Party in Illinois after its members joined with several powerful local political factions including, notably, the Independent Democrat movement of Chicago that helped elect James Hutchinson Woodworth Mayor in 1848.

The early Illinois Republican Party enjoyed many members from commerce who shared the vision of Illinois generally, and Chicago in particular, as a gateway to the Western frontier of the United States. The early party members quickly identified their shared anti-slavery sentiment which further differentiated them from the older parties based on the East Coast. Many early members of the party failed to gain statewide office or election to the United States Congress due to this anti-slavery view, although this early position of the party in Illinois would later propel several candidates to prominent office, including the Governorship of Illinois won by Richard Yates, and in the mid-1850s, the election of former Chicago Mayor James Hutchinson Woodworth to one term in the United States House of Representatives.

On May 9–10, 1860 the Illinois Republican State Convention was held in Decatur. At this convention Abraham Lincoln received his first endorsement for president of the United States. Until 1932, Republicans had virtually complete control over Illinois politics.

From 1932 to 1994, Republicans still usually had more control over Illinois politics, although Democrats still had a presence in the state and many noted Democratic politicians, most notably Adlai Stevenson II (lost to Republican Dwight Eisenhower twice), came from Illinois. President Ronald Reagan also came from Illinois, despite living in and serving two terms as Governor of California. The last time Republican carried in presidential elections was 1988, when George H. W. Bush won Illinois by 2.1% marginal points.

After the 1990s
By the late 1990s, though, Illinois had started to become more Democratic in presidential elections, partly because the Republican's social conservatism in other states had started to alienated many Northeastern and some Midwestern Republican voters. Illinois rapidly became more Democratic in the second half of the 1990s and early 2000s. In contrast, most GOP candidates in Illinois gubernatorial and U.S. Senate races in recent years have been almost indistinguishable from Democrats on both social and fiscal issues, with the notable exception of Peter Fitzgerald who won the Senate race in 1998. While this tendency has helped Illinois GOP candidates in the suburbs, it has alienated many conservative voters downstate.

Other than a brief majority from 1995 to 1997 as a result of the Republican Revolution, the Republicans have been in the minority in the state House of Representatives since 1982. In 2002, while the Republicans did well in 2002 midterm elections nationwide, the Illinois Republicans lost their majority when a Democrat became Illinois governor for the first time in 26 years and Democrats gained control of the Illinois Senate, putting the party in the minority for the first time in state history.

Recent events
The 2010 elections saw the election of Illinois Republican Mark Kirk to the US Senate as well as a Republican sweep of Illinois US House seats. Republicans came within 5 seats of a majority in the Illinois House of Representatives and gained seats in the Senate. Republican nominee Bill Brady narrowly lost the gubernatorial election to Pat Quinn, leaving Democrats in full control of the redistricting process. This resulted in gerrymandering heavily in favor of Democrats. As a result of the redistricting process, Illinois Republicans suffered huge losses in the 2012 elections.

In 2013, the state party attempted to oust Chairman Pat Brady after he came out in favor of same-sex marriage. Brady would ultimately resign and was briefly replaced by Jack Dorgan. In 2014, Tim Schneider, who was a member of the Cook County Board of Commissioners, was named the chairman of the state party.

In the 2014 gubernatorial election, Republican nominee Bruce Rauner defeated incumbent Governor Pat Quinn to become the first GOP Governor since George Ryan left office in 2003. Republicans also picked up two Illinois congressional seats and a seat in the Illinois Senate.

During the 2018 Illinois Elections, Rauner lost to J. B. Pritzker in a landslide with the party also losing two congressional seats (Roskam and Hultgren) and becoming a superminority in the state legislature.

By 2021, the Illinois Republican Party was a minority party wielding little power within the state. With a decline that goes back over two decades, the state GOP's shrinking influence is attributed to Illinois becoming a solid blue state, the loss of voters in suburban areas, and the divisive embrace of Donald Trump and Trumpism.

The 2020 Elections saw a moderate swing back to the party in terms of votes, however this did not lead to major seat gains. The party lost one seat in the State Senate and gained one in the State House. However State Supreme Court Justice Thomas L. Kilbride was defeated in his bid for retention with the intention of flipping the seat to the Republicans in 2022.

Schneider stepped down as chairman in December 2020 and was replaced by Don Tracy, who was the chairman of the Illinois Gaming Board, in February 2021.

Organization and leadership
The Illinois Republican Party is run by the Illinois Republican State Central Committee, which consists of 18 members, one representing each of the state's congressional districts.

Past chairmen (partial list)

Current elected officials
After the 2018 elections, Republicans hold a minority of 5 of the state's 18 U.S. House seats and none of the statewide offices. The Republicans are also the minority in both chambers of the state legislature.

Members of Congress

U.S. Senate
 None

Both of Illinois's U.S. Senate seats have held by Democrats since 2016. Mark Kirk was the last Republican to represent Illinois in the U.S. Senate. First elected in 2010, Kirk lost his bid for a second term in the 2016 election to Tammy Duckworth.

U.S. House of Representatives
Out of the 17 seats Illinois is apportioned in the U.S. House of Representatives, 3 are held by Republicans:

Statewide offices
None

In 2018, Republican Governor Bruce Rauner and Lieutenant Governor Evelyn Sanguinetti lost their bid for a second term to Democrats J. B. Pritzker and Juliana Stratton. No Illinois Republican has been elected to the office of Comptroller since 2010, the office of Attorney General since 1998, the office of Secretary of State since 1994, or the office of State Treasurer since 2010.

Notable legislators
 Senate Minority Leader: Dan McConchie
State Senator: Darren Bailey

Mayoral offices
Some of the state's major cities have Republican mayors. As of 2021, Republicans control the mayor's offices in four of Illinois's ten largest cities: 
Aurora (2): Richard Irvin
Joliet (4): Bob O'Dekirk
Naperville (5): Steve Chirico
Champaign (10): Deborah Frank Feinen

Former elected officials

Members of Congress

U.S Senate 

 Mark Kirk (2010-2017)
 Peter Fitzgerald (1999-2005)
 Charles H. Percy (1967-1985)
 Everett Dirksen (1951-1969)

U.S House 

 IL-6: Peter Roskam
IL-6: Henry Hyde
 IL-8: Joe Walsh
 IL-10: Bob Dold
 IL-14: Randy Hultgren
 IL-15: John Shimkus
IL-18: Ray LaHood

Governor 

 Bruce Rauner (2015-2019)
 George Ryan (1999-2003)
 Jim Edgar (1991-1999)
 James R. Thompson (1977-1991)

See also

Democratic Party of Illinois
Political party strength in Illinois
Government of Illinois

References

External links
https://illinois.gop, the Republican Party of Illinois website
http://www.crnc.org/chapters/illinois/, Illinois College Republican Federation website

1856 establishments in Illinois
Political parties established in 1856
 
Republican Party
Illinois